Kettapeptin is a depsipeptide antibiotic isolated from Streptomyces. It is effective against gram positive bacteria, as well as the fungi Candida albicans, Mucor miehei, and the microalgae Scenedesmus subspicatus.

References

Antibiotics
Depsipeptides